Gossypium australe is an endemic woody shrub, related to cotton, found in north western Australia. Preferring sandy soils near watercourses, it grows to about two or three feet tall.  

It is sometimes confused with Sturt's desert rose Gossypium sturtianum.

References

australe
Rosids of Western Australia
Malvales of Australia
Taxa named by Ferdinand von Mueller